Jacqueline Anne Hand (born 19 February 1999) is a New Zealand footballer who plays as a forward for the Colorado College Tigers and the New Zealand national team.

International career
Hand made her international debut for New Zealand in their 1–5 loss to Canada in October 2021. She scored her first goal in November 2021 in a friendly match against South Korea, which they lost 2–1.

International goals

References

External links
 

1999 births
Living people
New Zealand women's association footballers
New Zealand women's international footballers
Women's association football midfielders
Colorado College Tigers women's soccer players
Association footballers from Auckland
People educated at Mount Albert Grammar School
Expatriate women's soccer players in the United States
New Zealand expatriate sportspeople in the United States
New Zealand expatriate women's association footballers